Wang Shizhen (1861–1930), courtesy name Pinqing (聘卿), was a Chinese general and politician of the Republic of China.

Biography
Wang was born in Zhengding, Zhili in 1861. He was the Minister of War in the Qing Dynasty under Yuan Shikai and in the Republic of China three times, 1915–1916 and twice in 1917. He was the Premier of China from 1917 to 1918.

External links

1861 births
1930 deaths
Republic of China Army generals
Premiers of the Republic of China
Republic of China politicians from Hebei
Politicians from Shijiazhuang
Generals from Hebei
Viceroys of Huguang
People from Zhengding County